Five Points is an unincorporated community in southern Franklin County, North Carolina, United States. The primary cross roads where the community is located are N.C. Highway 98, Pearces Road (SR 1001) and John Winstead Road (SR 1717).

References

Unincorporated communities in Franklin County, North Carolina
Unincorporated communities in North Carolina